Stanley Tepend (born 15 May 1973) is a Papua New Guinean professional rugby league coach who is the head coach of the PNG Hunters in the Hostplus Cup and  national coach of the  Papua New Guinea Kumuls.

Playing career
Tepend played for the Enga Mioks in the PNG SP Inter-city cup national competition.

The Enga Mioks won the 2000 Digicel cup with Tepend starting at hooker in the win.

Coaching career
Some of Tepend's earliest coaching roles were as an assistant for the PNG national side at the 2017 World Cup and a six time premiership winner as the foundation head coach of the Lae Snax Tigers in the PNG NRL Competition. He is currently an assistant coach with the PNG Hunters in the Queensland Hostplus Cup.

In 2022 Tepend was appointed head coach of the 13-aside Papua New Guinea national rugby league team after Michael Marum left to pursue a career in politics. He is PNG's 13th National Coach and 5th former PNG Kumuls player after John Wagambie, Stanley Gene, Adrian Lam and Michael Marum  to become coach of the Kumuls.

References

1973 births
Living people
Papua New Guinea national rugby league team coaches
Papua New Guinea national rugby league team players
Papua New Guinean rugby league coaches
Papua New Guinean rugby league players
Place of birth missing (living people)